The Multani  are a traditionally nomadic Banjara community of India who historically specialised in the transport and trade of grain.

See also 

 Gujarati Muslims
 Pinjara

References 

Muslim communities of Gujarat
Multan District
Banjara people